Leymus condensatus, the giant wildrye, is a wild rye grass native to eastern  Oregon, California and northern Mexico.

Description
Leymus condensatus also commonly referred to as Canyon Prince is a type of wild rye that is part of the Poaceae (Grass Family). It grows in bunches or clumps, a bunch grass, stays green all year, and has a distinctive silver blue foliage. It is drought tolerant, growing in coastal sage scrub, chaparral, the California oak woodlands of southern oak woodland and foothill woodland, and Joshua tree woodlands, rarely in wetlands. It often hybridizes with Leymus triticoides, producing the common hybrid grass Leymus x multiflorus. The plant's leaves and seeds are often consumed by both mammals and birds.

References

External links
Giant Wild Rye Data Sheet (Leymus Condensatus 'Canyon Prince')
Jepson Manual Treatment: Leymus condensatus
USDA Plants Profile: Leymus condensatus
Grass Manual Treatment: Leymus condensatus
Leymus condensatus — Photo gallery
Calflora

condensatus
Bunchgrasses of North America
Native grasses of California
Grasses of Mexico
Flora of Baja California
Flora of the California desert regions
Natural history of the California chaparral and woodlands
Natural history of the California Coast Ranges
Natural history of the Channel Islands of California
Natural history of the Mojave Desert
Natural history of the Peninsular Ranges
Natural history of the San Francisco Bay Area
Natural history of the Santa Monica Mountains
Natural history of the Transverse Ranges
Plants described in 1830
Garden plants of North America
Drought-tolerant plants